Bismuth subcitrate potassium is a bismuth salt used in combination with antibiotics and a proton pump inhibitor for the treatment of Helicobacter pylori infections.

A fixed-dose combination with the antibiotics metronidazole and tetracycline is sold under the trade name Pylera.

Contraindications

Side effects

A known side effect of bismuth salts is harmless and reversible darkening of tongue and stool by formation of bismuth sulfite. Other side effects of bismuth containing combination therapies are often difficult to assign to a specific component.

Interactions 

Bismuth absorption is increased by ranitidine and omeprazole.

Pharmacology

Mechanism of action
The mechanism of action of bismuth is not known. It has been reasoned to interfere with the function of the bacterial cell membrane, protein and cell wall synthesis, the enzyme urease, cell adhesion, ATP synthesis, and iron transport mechanisms.

Chemical properties
Bismuth subcitrate potassium is a salt of bismuth (Bi3+), potassium (K+) and citrate (C6H4O74−) in a molar ratio of about 1:5:2, with 3 moles of water. It contains about 25.6% (mass percent) bismuth, which is the active moiety, and 22.9% potassium. Other sources give somewhat different ratios of the constituents.

See also 
 Helicobacter pylori eradication protocols
 Bismuth subsalicylate

References 

Bismuth compounds
Citrates
Helicobacter pylori